Traminda aventiaria, the cross-line wave moth, is a moth of the family Geometridae. The species was first described by Achille Guenée in 1858. It is found in the Indian subregion, Sri Lanka, to Hong Kong, Taiwan, New Guinea and Australia.

Description
Its wings are dull pale green to reddish. An oblique ochreous-green fasciae is found on the forewings. Discal ring on forewing strong. The caterpillar is variegated light and dark brown and cylindrical in shape with lateral expansions to body. The caterpillar rest on leaf surfaces with a highly looped appearance. Pupa claviform. Cremaster triangular. Pupation occurs in a cocoon made by silk threads woven among leaves.

Host plants include Albizia, Pithecellobium dulce, Rosa species, Oenanthe javanica, and Acacia species such as Acacia leiocalyx, Acacia decurrens, Acacia concurrens, Acacia pennata and Acacia aulacocarpa.

Gallery

References

External links
Traminda aventiaria Nucleotide Result

Moths of Asia
Moths described in 1858
Geometridae